Michael David Peluso (born November 8, 1965), is an American former professional ice hockey player. Peluso was known primarily as an enforcer throughout his National Hockey League (NHL) career. Peluso played in the NHL from 1990 until 1998.

Playing career
Mike Peluso, known as a slick defenseman when drafted in 1985 by the New Jersey Devils, played for the University of Alaska Anchorage until 1989 rather than signing a professional contract with the NHL club. He signed as a free agent for the Chicago Blackhawks in 1989, and started his National Hockey League career in 1990.

Upon joining the Hawks, he was switched to forward and encouraged to fight in order to stay in the lineup. He fought Basil McRae of the Minnesota North Stars in his first NHL game and recorded 728 penalty minutes in his first two years in Chicago. With 408 of these coming in 63 games during the 1991–92 NHL season, Peluso became one of only three players in NHL history, and the most recent, to have accumulated 400 PIM or more in a single season.

He spent parts of three years in Chicago before going to the new Ottawa Senators as the 21st pick in the 1992 NHL Expansion Draft. During his only season in Ottawa, he set the club record for most penalty minutes in a single season (318), but was allowed to play a more offensive role, scoring 15 goals along with 10 assists. Nevertheless, on June 26, 1993, he was traded to the New Jersey Devils to complete an earlier transaction that sent Craig Billington, Troy Mallette and Cosmo Dupaul, New Jersey's fourth round choice in 1993 Entry Draft, to Ottawa.

As in Ottawa, Peluso's gritty, hard-nosed and intimidating style made him something of a cult hero in New Jersey. He was an integral part of the infamous "Crash Line" with Randy McKay and Bobby Holík, a fourth-line combination whose energy and timely goal-scoring helped the Devils win their first of three  Stanley Cups in 1995.

Peluso then played for the St. Louis Blues and Calgary Flames. His career came to an end after suffering a spinal cord injury in 1997. He retired after the 1997–1998 season.

Career statistics
Bold indicates led league

Injury and lawsuit
On December 18, 1993, while playing for the New Jersey Devils in a game against the Quebec Nordiques, Peluso was injured in a fight against Tony Twist. He was diagnosed with a concussion and sat out the next two games before returning to action five days later. Despite his continuing to play Peluso suffered a seizure and Dr. Marvin Ruderman allegedly wrote in January 1994 that Peluso: "...should not sustain any further trauma to his head or he will suffer additional seizures and long-lasting brain damage...." Because his role with the team was as an enforcer Peluso was expected to both sustain and dole out punishment, or as his lawsuit states: "...he was on the ice to fight."

Peluso remained on the roster and continued to play for the Devils for much of the next three years, including winning the 1995 Stanley Cup, but recalls overhearing then-trainer Teddy Schuch wonder as to Peluso's health only to be overruled by team doctor Barry Fisher. Peluso was later traded to the St. Louis Blues during the 1996–97 NHL season before finishing his professional career with the Calgary Flames the following year.

In 2012, after years of suffering from seizures, dementia, memory loss, anxiety and depression, Peluso filed for workers' compensation in California, naming the last four teams he had played for in his NHL career (he suited up for the Ottawa Senators prior to sustaining the concussion) as defendants. In the filing Peluso alleged that he spent tens of thousands of dollars on medical procedures and medication to alleviate his ailments. After several years of litigation Peluso was offered a $325,000 settlement but rejected the offer in August 2017.

Several months passed with no resolution in the matter and in January 2019 Peluso sued the New Jersey Devils, former general manager Lou Lamoriello and doctors Marvin Ruderman, Len Jaffe and Barry Fisher. The suit alleges that Peluso's medical issues resulted from the injury he sustained in 1993, that team owners knew about the damage and hid the severity of the injury from him and the two teams that signed him subsequently.

References

External links
 

1965 births
Living people
Alaska Anchorage Seawolves men's ice hockey players
American men's ice hockey left wingers
American people of Italian descent
Calgary Flames players
Chicago Blackhawks players
Edmonton Oilers scouts
Ice hockey players from Minnesota
Indianapolis Ice players
New Jersey Devils draft picks
New Jersey Devils players
Ottawa Senators players
People from Itasca County, Minnesota
St. Louis Blues players
Stanley Cup champions